Anna Magdalena is a romantic fantasy comedy film from Hong Kong, made in 1998 and starring Aaron Kwok, Kelly Chen and Takeshi Kaneshiro. It was the directorial debut of production designer Yee Chung-Man.

Title
The title refers to the keyboard piece Minuet in G Major believed to have been written by Johann Sebastian Bach's colleague, Christian Petzold, from the 1725 Notebook for Anna Magdalena Bach. Anna Magdalena was Bach's second wife. The music attracts the attention of Chan Kar-fu and Yau Muk-yan as Mok Man-yee plays it on her piano. The film score uses this theme repeatedly.

Synopsis
The film structure loosely follows that of the minuet: four "movements", which are announced by titles: two themes, a duet, and a set of variations. 1- Chan Kar-fu's (Takeshi Kaneshiro) introduction 2- Yau Muk-yan's (Aaron Kwok) effect on his life 3- Mok Man-Yee's (Kelly Chen) effect on their lives 4- Chan Kar-fu's literary vision of love. This fourth "movement" (Variations) is a wild fantasy on the previous material, based on the novel written by Kaneshiro's character: The XO Pair.

Unemployed aspiring writer Yau Muk-yan (Aaron Kwok) moves into the apartment of Chan Kar-fu (Takeshi Kaneshiro), a shy piano tuner. Both will soon fall in love with their new neighbor Mok Man-Yee (Kelly Chen).

Cast includes
 Aaron Kwok as Yau Muk-yan
 Kelly Chen as Mok Man-Yee
 Takeshi Kaneshiro as Chan Kar-fu
 Jacky Cheung as Policeman (cameo)
 Leslie Cheung as Editor (cameo)
 Anita Yuen as Assistant Editor
 Josie Ho as Cindy, Yau Muk-yan's former girlfriend
 Leo Ku as Client in restaurant (cameo)
 Eric Tsang as Building watchman (cameo)
 Wei Wei as Mrs. Leung
 Yu Wai-Lung as Child X
 Yuki Lai as Child O
 Jojo Hui as Masked woman

Filming locations
 Hong Kong
 Vietnam for the fantasy scenes

Reception
The film grossed HK$7.8 million in Hong Kong.

Awards and nominations
18th Hong Kong Film Awards:
 Nominated - Best Cinematography (Peter Pau)
 Nominated - Best Art Direction (Poon Chi-wai)
 Nominated - Best Costume Design (Ng Lei-lo)
 Nominated - Best Original Score (Chiu Tsang-hei)
1999 Hong Kong Film Critics Society Awards
 Won: Film of Merit

See also
 Aaron Kwok filmography
 List of Hong Kong films

References

External links
 hkcinemagic entry (includes trailers)
 lovehkfilm entry
 chinesecinemas.org entry (detailed review)
 fareastfilms
 Russian film review (includes pictures)
 brns entry (more pictures)
 Soundtrack listing
 
 

1998 films
1998 romantic comedy films
Hong Kong romantic comedy films
1990s romantic fantasy films
1990s Cantonese-language films
Golden Harvest films
Films about classical music and musicians
Films set in Hong Kong
Films shot in Hong Kong
Films shot in Vietnam
1998 directorial debut films
1990s Hong Kong films